Located in the historic city of Gonbad-e Kavus, Gonbad Kavous University is the major higher education institution in the eastern part of Golestan Province, Iran. Officially accredited/recognized by the Ministry of Science Research and Technology, Iran, the university is a public and coeducational higher education institution and it offers courses and programs leading to officially recognized higher education degrees such as bachelor, Master and Ph.D. degrees in several areas of study. Gonbad Kavous University also provides several academic and non-academic facilities and services to students including a library, as well as administrative services.

History 
Gonbad Kavous University established as a college of agriculture in 1983. The university starts its work with two associate degrees under the supervision of University of Mazandaran. In 1999, the university increased its number of schools and disciplines and expanded as one of the faculties of Gorgan University of Agricultural Sciences and Natural Resources and Agriculture. With the second presidential visit in 2008, the university became separated from Gorgan University and, in October 2008, changed its title to Gonbad Higher Education Complex. Gonbad Higher Education Complex continued its activity with associate, bachelor and master's degrees in 25 field of studies divided into three main faculties (Faculty of Agricultural Sciences and Natural Resources, Faculty of Science and Engineering, and Faculty of Humanities and Physical Education).

In May 2011, the deputy minister for education of Ministry of Science, Research and Technology announced that Gonbad Higher Education Complex was promoted to Gonbad University. Currently, Gonbad Kavous University has more than 3600 students, and offers 74 field of study and discipline in five faculties and five degree levels.

Faculties 
The university has the following faculties and research centers:
Faculty of Agriculture and Natural Resources
Department of Plant Production
Department of Animal Science
Department of Fisheries and Forestry
Department of Pasturage, Watershed and Wood Sciences
Faculty of Basic Sciences & Engineering
Department of Mathematics and Statistics
Department of Biology
Department of Chemistry
Department of Physics
Department of Electrical Engineering
Department of Informatique
Faculty of Humanities & Physical Education
Department of Economics and Geography
Department of Language and Literature
Department of Sport Sciences
Department of Philosophy
Minoodasht Engineering
Department of Civil Engineering
Department of Computer Sciences
Azadshahr Social Sciences
Department of Management Science

Journals
 Journal of Applied Research of Plant Ecophysiology
 Journal of Applied Ichthyological Research
 Journal of Plant Ecosystem Conservation

Address
Basirat Blvd, Shahid Fallshi Str, Gonbad Kavous, P.O. 163

See also

Higher education in Iran

References

External links
Gonbad Kavous University website

Educational institutions in Asia